WSBH (98.5 MHz) is a commercial FM radio station licensed to Satellite Beach, Florida and serving the Space Coast including Melbourne and Brevard County. The station is owned by Horton Broadcasting Company, Inc.  It broadcasts a classic hits radio format.

WSBH has an effective radiated power (ERP) of 6,000 watts.  It has a construction permit from the Federal Communications Commission to increase its power to 25,000 watts.

References

External links

SBH
2006 establishments in Florida
Radio stations established in 2006